The women's triple jump event at the 1991 Summer Universiade was held at the Don Valley Stadium in Sheffield on 20 July 1991. It was the first time that this event was contested by women at the Games.

Results

References

Athletics at the 1991 Summer Universiade
1991